Jennifer Finch (born August 5, 1966) is an American musician, designer, and photographer most notable for being the primary bass player of the punk rock band L7.  Active in L7 from 1986 to 1996, Finch also wrote music and performed with her bands OtherStarPeople and The Shocker in the interim before joining the reunited L7 in 2014.

Early life
Finch was born August 5, 1966 and grew up in West Los Angeles. She was adopted in 1967 by Robert Edward Finch, an aeronautics engineer, and his wife Sandra Jacobson; they later divorced in 1974. Finch credits the support of her adoptive father, who was also an amateur photographer, as being instrumental to her creative development. Finch took an interest in photography at an early age and attended a summer art session at Otis Parsons in 1980.

Career

Music
Finch began her musical career in the mid 1980s.  She played bass in the San Francisco-based band Sugar Babydoll (or Sugar Babylon) from 1984 - 1986. The band featured Courtney Love, future founder of Hole, and future Babes in Toyland founder Kat Bjelland. This line-up produced a demo recording which remains unreleased. Finch subsequently played in the short-lived Hollywood band The Pandoras, formed by bassist Gwynne Kahn.

In 1986, Finch joined the Los Angeles-based punk rock group L7.  In the documentary film L7: Pretend We’re Dead, bandmate Donita Sparks described Finch as "persistent" and stated that after Finch joined the band, her networking skills and stage energy continued to significantly boost the momentum building within the group.  She remained with L7 throughout the band's most successful period in the early 1990s.  Finch contributed to the albums L7 (1988) Smell the Magic(1990), Bricks Are Heavy (1992), and Hungry for Stink (1994).  Finch was the sole songwriter during this period for several of L7's songs including "(Right On) Thru", "Everglade", "One More Thing", and "Shirley".

In 1994, Finch and her L7 bandmate Demetra "Dee" Plakas performed with Japanese musician Hide, also appearing in the original video for his song "Doubt".

In 1994, Finch was featured in a music video for Hole for their breakthrough album Live Through This, as the original bassist Kristen Pfaff had died of an over-dose in June of that year. In 1995, after the death of her father, Finch adopted the name "Precious" as an homage to him. Finch officially departed L7 in 1996. In the bands 2016 documentary L7: Pretend We’re Dead, Finch cites health and money issues, as well as grieving over the loss of her father and the band’s roadie and friend Umbar as reasons for her departure. 

After departing from L7, Finch wrote music and sang for her band OtherStarPeople with Xander Smith.  OtherStarPeople completed their debut record Diamonds In The Belly Of The Dog in 1998;  the group were signed with A&M Records/Interscope and the album was released in August 1999. Joshua Clover of Spin magazine described the OtherStarPeople record as bringing "less weight and more strangeness than Finch's old crew - it's L.A.-slick and punky-dirty".

Finch was also involved with Betty Blowtorch, appearing in the 2003 documentary film Betty Blowtorch And Her Amazing True Life Adventures.

Finch founded the punk rock group The Shocker in Los Angeles in 2002.  The band played dates on the Warped Tour in 2003 and 2005.  The Shocker released Up Your Ass Tray as an EP in 2003, followed by a full-length album in 2006 on Go-Kart Records.  Finch served as the sole songwriter and primary singer of The Shocker through 2006.

In January 2011, Finch co-founded new band Sex in Progress along with Evie Evil of Evil Beaver.

Finch produced a Ramones' tribute album Brats on the Beat for the St. Jude Children's Research Hospital. The album features "kid friendly" versions of Ramones' songs with guest vocals and music provided by various punk musicians.

In 2014, L7 reformed with the primary line up of Finch with Suzi Gardner, Donita Sparks , and Dee Plakas.  They toured extensively and released new singles in 2017 and 2018.

L7's latest full album Scatter the Rats was released on Blackheart Records on May 3, 2019 to generally favorable reviews.  Finch wrote the song "Garbage Truck".  The band resumed a six-week national tour starting on May 10, 2019.

Photography
At the age of 13, Finch began to take photos of her friends in Los Angeles on a camera given to her by her father. These pictures eventually documented the early punk scene that she became involved in before joining L7 in 1986. Her photography (1979–1995) was on display at an LA Weekly sponsored art show at Aidan Ryley Taylor Gallery in Hollywood, until November 18, 2006. The collection, called "14 and Shooting" features a number of notable figures, including photographs of The Red Hot Chili Peppers, Bad Religion, Red Kross, and The Cramps.  John Albert of LA Weekly reflected that Finch's images often depict the musicians in more intimate moments as well as providing a generally dark perspective of youth in Southern California.  Finch's photographs traveled to the Rock and Roll Hall of Fame for display in January 2007.

Television and film
Finch has acted in the 1984 film The Census Taker and in the 1994 John Waters film Serial Mom as part of the fictitious band the Camel Lips.  Finch appeared as herself in the 2007 documentary Punk's Not Dead. Her music was featured in the 1999 film Office Space and on the popular TV series Degrassi: The Next Generation in 2008.

Finch appears in interviews and original footage throughout the documentary film L7: Pretend We're Dead, directed by Sarah Price and released in November 2016.  The film was nominated for a VO5 NME Award for Best Music Film.

Personal life
In the early 1990s, Finch dated Nirvana's Dave Grohl and later Billy Corgan of The Smashing Pumpkins. She was married to actor, musician and race car driver Chris Pedersen from 2000–2007.  Finch resides in Culver City, California.

Discography

L7
L7 (1988)
Smell the Magic (1990)
Bricks are Heavy (1992)
Hungry for Stink (1994)
Scatter the Rats (2019)

OtherStarPeople
Diamonds in The Belly of The Dog (1999)

The Shocker
Up Your Ass Tray EP (Oglio Records, 2003)
Up Your Ass Tray: The Full Length (Go Kart, 2006)

References

External links
Jennifer Finch Photography
Ramones for Kids website

1966 births
Living people
American adoptees
American punk rock bass guitarists
Women bass guitarists
Women punk rock singers
L7 (band) members
Feminist musicians
Riot grrrl musicians
American abortion-rights activists
San Francisco State University alumni
Activists from California
Guitarists from Los Angeles
American women guitarists
20th-century American bass guitarists
20th-century American women musicians
Punk Rock Karaoke members
Women in punk